Lindsay Davenport was the defending champion, but was eliminated in the semifinals by Svetlana Kuznetsova.

Kuznetsova went on to win the title, defeating Marion Bartoli 7–5, 6–2 in the final.

Seeds
The top two seeds received a bye into the second round.

Draw

Finals

Top half

Bottom half

References

External links
 Main and Qualifying Draws

Commonwealth Bank Tennis Classic
Commonwealth Bank Tennis Classic
Sport in Bali